Ngkesill is an island geographically located at  of Palau.

References

Uninhabited islands of Palau